Kathleen Stephens was the United States ambassador to South Korea from 2008 to 2011.  She also served as the United States' chargé d'affaires to India from March to December 2014. She currently leads the Korea Economic Institute of America as president and CEO.

Early life
Stephens was born in west Texas and grew up in New Mexico and Arizona. She holds a B.A. in East Asian studies from Prescott College and a master's degree from Harvard University, and also studied at the University of Hong Kong and Oxford University. After college, she was a Peace Corps volunteer in South Korea's Yesan, South Chungcheong from 1975 to 1977; it was then that she was given her Korean name Shim Eungyeong (심은경).

Career
Stephens joined the United States Foreign Service in 1978. Early in her career, Stephens served at U.S. missions in the People's Republic of China (1980–1982) and in Trinidad and Tobago (1978–1980). Her tour of duty in South Korea included roles as internal political unit chief at the U.S. Embassy in Seoul (1984–1987) and Principal Officer at the U.S. Consulate in Busan (1987–1989). Afterwards, she worked as a political officer at the U.S. missions in Belgrade and Zagreb (1991–1992), senior desk officer for the United Kingdom in the Bureau of European Affairs (1992–1994), Director for European Affairs at the United States National Security Council, 1994–1995, Principal Officer at the U.S. Consulate General in Belfast, Northern Ireland, 1995–1998, Deputy Chief of Mission at the U.S. Embassy in Lisbon, Portugal, 1998–2001, and Director of the Office of Ecology and Terrestrial Conservation at the United States Department of State, 2001–2003.

Stephens assumed her duties as Deputy Assistant Secretary for European and Eurasian Affairs on December 5, 2003, during which her primary responsibility was policy oversight and management of relations with the countries of South-Central Europe. Following that, she assumed her duties as Principal Deputy Assistant Secretary of State for the Bureau of East Asian and Pacific Affairs in June 2005. In that capacity she was responsible for a variety of Bureau-wide issues, including post management. She had particular responsibility for the management of U.S. relations with Japan and Korea.

In September 2015, she was named the William J. Perry Distinguished Fellow at Stanford University's Shorenstein Asia-Pacific Research Center (APARC). She speaks several foreign languages including Korean, Serbo-Croatian, and Chinese. As of September 1, 2018 the board of directors at the Korea Economic Institute of America (KEI) announced  they approved Ambassador Stephens as the next President & CEO.

U.S. Ambassador to South Korea

Stephens was nominated to be U.S. Ambassador to the Republic of Korea in 2008.  On August 1, 2008, the US Senate confirmed Stephens' nomination as US ambassador to South Korea.

On October 8, 2008, Stephens presented her credentials to President Lee Myung-bak of South Korea. The Chosun Ilbo reported that Stephens spoke to Lee in fluent Korean during parts of their meeting and said she would strengthen ties between the two countries. On October 9, 2008, Stephens visited Yesan Middle School where she had taught as a Peace Corps volunteer 33 years before. "Yesan is where I learned the qualities I needed to be a diplomat," said Stephens. "I had warm-hearted colleagues who were out there for me, and students who studied hard despite many difficulties. I learned how to endure hardships and convince others, which is essential for a diplomat."

Awards and Recognitions

Stephens has been honored by the U.S. Government and numerous private organizations. Her awards include the Presidential Meritorious Service Award (2009), the Sejong Cultural Award, the Korea-America Friendship Association Award (2013), and the Kevin O'Donnell Distinguished Friends of Korea Award (2016). She is a trustee at The Asia Foundation, on the boards of the Korea Society and Pacific Century Institute, and a member of the American Academy of Diplomacy.

Personal life
Stephens resides in California. She is a fluent speaker of Korean and Serbo-Croatian, and speaks Cantonese and Mandarin with limited competence.

See also
 United States Ambassador to Korea

References

External links

 Chief of Mission, Official Infopage
 
 

Prescott College alumni
Harvard University alumni
People from Texas
Living people
Ambassadors of the United States to South Korea
United States Under Secretaries of State
Peace Corps volunteers
The Asia Foundation
United States Foreign Service personnel
1953 births
American women ambassadors
21st-century American women